Julian Hosking (1953-1989) was a British ballet dancer and a former principal dancer with the Royal Ballet.

Hosking was born in Cornwall of a Viennese mother and Cornish father. He entered White Lodge aged 11 and progressed to the Royal Ballet School.
Joining the company in 1970, he danced a wide range of roles across the Royal Ballet repertoire at Covent Garden from 1971 to 1986.
These included leads in Kenneth MacMillan's 1979 La Fin du jour and his 1980 Gloria for the Royal Ballet. He became a Principal in 1980. He also danced in the premieres of Manon, Four Schumann Pieces, and Consort Lessons, and the first performances by the Royal Ballet of Liebeslieder Walzer, My Brother, My Sisters and Return to the Strange Land.

In 1983, Hosking danced a lead role in Glen Tetley's Dances of Albion: Dark Night Glad Day, and Anna Kisselgoff writing in the New York Times called him "the hero of the evening".

Hosking took time away from the Royal Ballet from 1975 to 1977 to study Egyptology and art in Italy with the artist, André Durand. Hosking who lived with Durand for eight years, was the subject of many paintings, the artist painted, both mythological (Miracles and Metamorphous) and portraits.

He may be seen as Edward Gordon Craig (a role he created) in the television filmed version of Isadora from 1982 (issued on DVD in 2011 by Odeon Entertainment, with the 1968 feature film Isadora) and as Paris in the 1984 Royal Ballet film of Romeo and Juliet.

References

External links
Gallery of photographs of Julian Hosking by André Durand

Principal dancers of The Royal Ballet
British male ballet dancers
1953 births

1989 deaths
Place of birth missing